Oxley railway station is located on the Main line in Queensland, Australia. It serves the Brisbane suburb of Oxley.

History
Oxley station was first opened in 1874. During the 1890s, a brick structure was built that still survives today.

In 2010, as part of the quadruplication of the Main line from Corinda to Darra to accommodate Springfield line services, a pair of tracks were built on either side of the existing two, with the western track receiving a new platform.

Services
Oxley is served by City network services operating from Nambour, Caboolture, Kippa-Ring and Bowen Hills to Springfield Central, Ipswich and Rosewood.

Services by platform

*Note: One weekday morning service (4:56am from Central) and selected afternoon peak services continue through to Rosewood.  At all other times, a change of train is required at Ipswich.

References

External links

Oxley station Queensland Rail
Oxley station Queensland's Railways on the Internet
[ Oxley station] TransLink travel information

Oxley, Queensland
Railway stations in Brisbane
Railway stations in Australia opened in 1874
Main Line railway, Queensland